Guangdonglu Subdistrict is a subdistrict and the seat of Zhuhui District in Hengyang, Hunan, China. The subdistrict of Guangdonglu has seven communities under its jurisdiction, its administration office is at No. 33 Guangxi Road.

History
The subdistrict of Guangdonglu is historically the Hunanlu Subdistrict formed in March 1955 and Changed to the current name in January 1982.

Subdivisions
The subdistrict was divided into 11 communities of Guangdonglu, Guangxilu, Hunanlu, Hubeilu, Xiangjiangdonglu, Linjianglu, Anquanli, Kuihuali, Hengjili, Hehuaping and Hepingxiaoqu before 2015. Through the amalgamation in 2016, the communities was reduced to seven from 11.

 Hubeilu Community
 Guihuali community
 Hehuaping Community
 Heping Xiaoqu Community
 Linjiang Community
 Shangxi Community
 Chezhanping Community

External links
 Official Website

References

Hengyang
Subdistricts of Hunan